That Gang of Mine is a 1940 film directed by Joseph H. Lewis and starring Leo Gorcey and Bobby Jordan. It is the third film in the East Side Kids series.

Plot
Old horseman Ben brings his beloved thoroughbred Bluenight to New York from Kentucky in hopes of developing him into a championship racer. Because the old man is down on his luck, the East Side boys offer to provide a makeshift quarters for Bluenight, and Algy Wilkes persuades his father to put up the entrance fee for the horse. Muggs Maloney, an aspiring but untested jockey, rides Bluenight in the race, but loses his nerve on the track, causing Bluenight to trail in the field. Seated in the stands is Morgan, a respected trainer, who recognizes the horse's ability and urges Mr. Wilkes to race the horse with an experienced jockey. However, Muggs insists upon doing the riding, and his pals induce Mr. Wilkes to give him another chance. Complications arise the night before the race when Nick, a crooked bookie, tries to sabotage Bluenight. The boys discover the plot and save the horse, but the next day, Muggs realizes that he cannot guide the horse to victory. With the use of his fists, he convinces jockey Jimmy Sullivan to take his place, and Bluenight finishes the race the winner.

Cast

The East Side Kids
Bobby Jordan as Danny Dolan
Leo Gorcey as Muggs Maloney
Sunshine Sammy as Scruno
David Gorcey as Peewee
Donald Haines as Skinny
Eugene Francis as Algy Wilkes

Remaining cast
Clarence Muse as Ben
Dave O'Brien as 'Knuckles' Dolan
Joyce Bryant as Louise
Milton Kibbee as Mr. Wilkes
Richard Terry as Henchman Blackie
Wilbur Mack as Nick Buffalo
Hazel Keener as Mrs. Wilkes
Forrest Taylor as Horse Trainer Morgan (uncredited)
Nick Wall as Jockey Jimmy Sullivan (uncredited)
Victor Adamson as Turf Club Extra

Crew
 Associate Producer: Pete Mayer
 Set Decoration: Fred Preble
 Production Management: Ed W. Rote
 Second Unit Director/Assistant Director: Arthur Hammond, Herman Pett
 Sound Recordist: Glen Glenn

References

External links
 

1940 films
American black-and-white films
1940s English-language films
Films directed by Joseph H. Lewis
1940 comedy films
Monogram Pictures films
American comedy films
Films produced by Sam Katzman
East Side Kids
1940s American films